Parectopa ophidias is a moth of the family Gracillariidae. It is known from South Australia.

References

Gracillariinae